White House is a city in Robertson and Sumner counties in the United States state of Tennessee. The population was  12,982 at the 2020 census. It is approximately twenty-two miles north of downtown Nashville.

History

Settlers
The area that is now White House was purchased around 1828 by Richard Stone Wilks, a settler from Virginia.  A trail running from Kentucky to Nashville, originally created by Native Americans, cut through the area.  This trail was originally known as the Louisville & Nashville Turnpike during the mid-19th century.  In 1928, the trail was renamed US Highway 31W.

Naming the town
In the mid-19th century, the Carter, Thomas, and Hough Stagecoach Company traveled the L&N Turnpike carrying passengers. A typical stop along the way was a white, two-story house built by Richard Wilks in 1829. The house was a popular stop for lodging, food, and changing out horses. President Andrew Jackson was even heard to have stayed here during his travels between his home and the White House.  During this time, houses were rarely painted white, particularly in this underdeveloped area. The stage coach drivers began to call this stop and the surrounding area White House.

Original White House torn down, building replaced
The monument for which the town was named was torn down in 1951 to make way for new development.  However, in 1986, the community erected a replica of the original building.  The reproduction, called the White House Inn Library and Museum, currently sits in the center of town next to the Fire Department.  It contains the library, a museum with artifacts from the area's early years, and the city's Chamber of Commerce. In 2015, the replica White House Inn Library and Museum was turned solely into a museum and Chamber of Commerce after the city built a new library.

Growth and development
White House was incorporated in 1971. Currently, the young town is experiencing population growth, economic progress, and community development, with many apartment projects and subdivisions planned for the area. There are over 800 homes planned for the area, and at least 5 apartment subdivisions are planned for the city. The city is located north of Nashville within the greater Nashville region, and is anticipated to grow rapidly in the future as a suburb of Nashville.

Geography

According to the United States Census Bureau, the city has a total area of 9.0 square miles (23.2 km2), all land.

White House is located along Interstate 65 at the intersection of State Highway 76 and US Highway 31W.

Demographics

2020 census

As of the 2020 United States census, there were 12,982 people, 4,345 households, and 3,512 families residing in the city.

2000 census
As of the census of 2000, there were 7,220 people, 2,497 households, and 2,060 families residing in the city. The population density was 805.3 people per square mile (310.8/km2). There were 2,578 housing units at an average density of 287.5 per square mile (111.0/km2). The racial makeup of the city was 97.35% White, 1.33% African American, 0.25% Native American, 0.35% Asian, 0.30% from other races, and 0.42% from two or more races. Hispanic or Latino of any race were 1.02% of the population.

There were 2,497 households, out of which 48.8% had children under the age of 18 living with them, 71.0% were married couples living together, 8.4% had a female householder with no husband present, and 17.5% were non-families. 15.4% of all households were made up of individuals, and 5.7% had someone living alone who was 65 years of age or older. The average household size was 2.89 and the average family size was 3.22.

In the city, the population was spread out, with 31.7% under the age of 18, 6.6% from 18 to 24, 37.8% from 25 to 44, 17.6% from 45 to 64, and 6.3% who were 65 years of age or older. The median age was 32 years. For every 100 females, there were 99.6 males. For every 100 females age 18 and over, there were 93.8 males.

The median income for a household in the city was $51,649, and the median income for a family was $55,731. Males had a median income of $38,448 versus $26,216 for females. The per capita income for the city was $19,890. About 2.3% of families and 3.3% of the population were below the poverty line, including 2.6% of those under age 18 and 9.0% of those age 65 or over.

Government

Incorporated under the Mayor and Aldermanic charter in 1971. The town's current mayor is John Corbitt.

Education

Public schools
The city is split into two counties, and therefore has two public school districts.
Sumner county public schools:
 Harold B. Williams Elementary School (K-4)
 White House Middle School (5-8)
 White House High School (9-12)

Robertson county public schools:
 Robert F. Woodall Elementary School (K-2)
 White House Heritage Elementary School (3-6)
 White House Heritage High School (7-12)

Private schools 
 Christian Community Schools (CCS)
 Dayspring Academy (DSA)

References

External links
  Official City Website
 Chamber of Commerce
  Current City News
  City News/Information
  White House High School (Sumner County Schools)
  White House Heritage High School (Robertson County Schools)

Cities in Robertson County, Tennessee
Cities in Sumner County, Tennessee
Cities in Tennessee
Cities in Nashville metropolitan area
Populated places established in 1829